Thomas Shardelow (11 November 1931 – 3 July 2019) was a South African cyclist. He competed at the 1952 and 1956 Summer Olympics. At the 1952 Olympics, he won silver medals in the 4,000 metres team pursuit and 2,000 metres tandem events.

References

External links
 
 

1931 births
2019 deaths
Sportspeople from Durban
South African male cyclists
Olympic cyclists of South Africa
Cyclists at the 1952 Summer Olympics
Cyclists at the 1956 Summer Olympics
Olympic silver medalists for South Africa
Olympic medalists in cycling
Medalists at the 1952 Summer Olympics
Cyclists at the 1954 British Empire and Commonwealth Games
Commonwealth Games bronze medallists for South Africa
Commonwealth Games medallists in cycling
20th-century South African people
21st-century South African people
Medallists at the 1954 British Empire and Commonwealth Games